The Cathedral (Ukrainian: Собор) is a 1968 novel by Oles Honchar. It was Honchar's best known novel but also saw him come under censure by the Brezhnev regime. The book was initially well received and massively popular among students. After sudden criticism of the novel, a group of literature students organized a defense of the novel, leading to surveillance and reprisals from the KGB. A planned translation to Russian was halted and the Ukrainian edition withdrawn. The titular cathedral was based on the story of the Holy Trinity Cathedral in Novomoskovsk, Ukraine.
Published in Russian in Roman-Gazeta issue 7, 1987.

See also

 List of Ukrainian-language poets
 List of Ukrainian-language writers
 Ukrainian literature

References

External links
Honchar's "Sobor" to be published in Ukrainian, by Dr. Roman Solchanyk

Ukrainian-language books
1968 novels
Ukrainian novels
Book censorship in the Soviet Union
Censored books
Novels set in Ukraine
Novels set in India
Fiction set in 1963
Novels set in the 1960s